The MIT Sloan Sports Analytics Conference (SSAC) is an annual event that provides a forum for industry professionals (executives and leading researchers) and students to discuss the increasing role of analytics in the sports industry. The conference is held in the Boston area and while its location has moved from the MIT campus to higher capacity convention centers, it has always occurred during February or March. 

Founded in 2006, the conference is co-chaired by Daryl Morey, President of basketball operations for the Philadelphia 76ers, and Jessica Gelman, CEO of KAGR (Kraft Analytics Group), who oversee MIT Sloan students (from the EMS Club) in the planning and operating of the yearly conference. It is the largest student-run conference in the world, attracting students from over 170 different schools and representatives from over 80 professional sports teams in the MLB, NBA, NFL, NHL, MLS, and Premier League. The conference has been sold out every year and has become the premier venue for sports analytics discussion. ESPN has been the presenting sponsor since 2010 and the conference has garnered national attention through media outlets such as Sports Illustrated, The Wall Street Journal, The New York Times, The Boston Globe, Time, BusinessWeek, NBC Sports, Fox Sports, ESPN's Pardon the Interruption, and Forbes. ESPN columnist Bill Simmons has nicknamed the conference Dorkapalooza.

The MIT Sloan Sports Analytics Conference was ranked #3 by Fast Company magazine in its 2012 ranking of the world's most innovative sports companies behind only the NFL and MLB Advanced Media.

Notes

References

Massachusetts Institute of Technology
Sports science
Sports records and statistics
Sports business
Analytics